Kerrier District is a 2004 studio album by Luke Vibert, released under the alias Kerrier District. Originally released in 2004 on Rephlex Records, it was re-released in 2016 on Hypercolour.

Critical reception
Andy Kellman of AllMusic gave the album 3.5 stars out of 5, saying, "Vibert leaves the impression that the foundation of each track was pulled off by a small cast of keyboardists, drum programmers, hand-percussionists, and horn players." Jean-Pierre of Tiny Mix Tapes gave the album 3.5 stars out of 5, stating that "the album mixes elements of reggae and dub on ‘Silhouettes,' Daft Punk-esque analog synths on 'Let's Dance and Freak,' and early '80s New York disco on 'Illogan.'"

Track listing

References

External links
 

2004 albums
Luke Vibert albums
Rephlex Records albums
House music albums by English artists